Mikko Laine (born February 9, 1976 in Espoo, Finland) is a forward for the HC TWK Innsbruck hockey.

External links

References 

 
 

1976 births
Living people
Finnish ice hockey right wingers
Espoo Blues players
HIFK (ice hockey) players
HPK players
Timrå IK players
Sportspeople from Espoo